Manuchehr Abbasi (also Romanized as Manūchehr ‘Abbāsī) is a village in Mahur Rural District, Mahvarmilani District, Mamasani County, Fars Province, Iran. At the 2006 census, its population was 26, in 7 families.

References 

Populated places in Mamasani County